Fray Lorenzo de San Nicolás (1593–1679) was a Spanish architect. As he was a member of a religious order, he was known by the Spanish language title "fray" (a shortening of the word "fraile", used by friars and members of certain religious orders).

Born in Madrid, his double career as an architect and a friar began in his teens.  He was influenced by his father who was also an architect and, in later life, an Augustinian friar.

He wrote and published Arte y Uso de la Arquitectura, in two tomes (1639, 1664), an influential book in baroque Spain and Spanish America of the X17th and 18th centuries.

References

External links

1593 births
1679 deaths
17th-century Spanish architects
Spanish architecture writers